Southville, Kentucky is an unincorporated community in Shelby County, Kentucky. It is the location of, or nearest community to, several places listed on the National Register of Historic Places:
Carriss's Feed Store, built in 1915, at KY 55 and KY 44, Southville, (Adams, James W.), NRHP-listed 
Carriss's Store, KY 714 and KY 53, Southville, (Adams, James W.), NRHP-listed
Dr. William Morris Office and House, KY 53, Southville, (Adams, James W.), NRHP-listed

References

Unincorporated communities in Shelby County, Kentucky
Unincorporated communities in Kentucky